The Akkineni Award for best home-viewing feature film winners was commissioned in 1991:

References

Home Viewing Feature Film